Game Changer is a comedy panel game show on Dropout created by Sam Reich. The show follows players (typically three players, mostly comedians), participating in a new game every episode, with the players usually not understanding the premise and rules of the game beforehand. The show has been described as one that "combines improv comedy, puzzle solving, fierce competition, and a prankster ethos."

History 
Game Changer was created as an original show for the streaming service Dropout. The show was announced on August 29, 2019 and released on September 20, 2019.

After CollegeHumor was sold by IAC and restructured in 2020, the company temporarily halted production of all shows. Game Changer, which was affected by this, released their already-completed second season in January. The third season of the show was recorded via video conference while the show returned to being recorded in the studio for its fourth season. In 2022, CollegeHumor produced three spin-offs based on previous episodes: Dirty Laundry which is based on the season 3 episode "Never Have I Ever", Make Some Noise based on the recurring episodes of the same name, and Play it by Ear based on the season 4 episode, "The Official Cast Recording".

Premise 
The show is based on one central theme: the players start the game knowing nothing. While some episodes may deviate from this theme, most episodes follow this format. Most episodes follow three contestants playing against each other by following prompts and tasks put out by the host of the show, Sam Reich. The show also parodies some shows like Survivor and The Bachelor. 

Occasionally, special guests will participate in the game. The very first episode featured the participants' significant others, and the inclusion of guests outside of the Dropout/CollegeHumor community began with the virtually filmed third season, which featured guests such as Tony Hawk and Giancarlo Esposito.

Episodes

Season 1 (2019)

Season 2 (2020)

Season 3 (2020-2021)

Season 3 was produced remotely due to lockdown restrictions in California due to the COVID-19 pandemic.

Season 4 (2021-2022)

Season 5 (2022-2023)

References 

CollegeHumor
2010s American game shows
2020s American game shows
American comedy web series
2019 web series debuts